Klubbb3 is an international Schlagerband, with the members being Schlager singers Florian Silbereisen (Germany), Jan Smit (Netherlands) and Christoff De Bolle (Belgium).

Band History 
In autumn 2015, Florian Silbereisen announced a band. According to their own information, the initiative came from the three singers themselves and without pressure from the record companies. Producer Tobias Reitz and songwriter Uwe Busse were hired. Their first single,  Du schaffst das schon, reached #66 on the German singles chart. Finally, on 8 January 2016, their debut album Vorsicht unzensiert! was released, which ranked 4th in the German, 33rd in the Dutch and 6th in the Flemish album charts

Members

Discography 

Albums

 2016: Vorsicht unzensiert! (Universal Music)
 2017: Jetzt geht's richtig los! (Universal Music)
 2018: Wir werden immer mehr! (Universal Music)

Singles

 2016: Du schaffst das schon
 2017: Jetzt erst recht!
 2017: Märchenprinzen (with Gloria von Thurn und Taxis)

Awards 

 Die Eins der Besten (One of the Best)
 2017: in the category Band of the year
 smago! Award
 2016: in the Category Hit-Tip 2016 (Du schaffst das schon)
 2017: in the category most successful Schlager band in Europe.
2017: Golden Ticket for "The Great Schlagerfest - The Party of the Year"

References

External links 

 Klubbb3 on the website for Universal Music
 Biografie der Band KLUBBB3 auf

Schlager groups
Musical groups established in 2015